Dryopteris expansa, the alpine buckler fern, northern buckler-fern or spreading wood fern, is a species of fern native to cool temperate and subarctic regions of the Northern Hemisphere, south at high altitudes in mountains to Spain and Greece in southern Europe, to Japan in eastern Asia, and to central California in North America. The species was first described from Germany. It prefers cool, moist mixed or evergreen forests and rock crevices on alpine slopes, often growing on rotting logs and tree stumps and rocky slopes. It is characteristically riparian in nature, and is especially associated with stream banks.

Description

The deltate fronds are bipinnate at the base, pinnate toward the apex. The rhizome is erect or ascending, often producing offshoots. Sori occur medially on the underside of the pinnae. Propagation is by spores and vegetatively by division of the rhizome.

It is easily confused with the related Dryopteris dilatata (broad buckler fern), differing in the usually smaller fronds, and in the pale brown scales on the frond stem being more uniform in color, rarely having a dark central stripe. It also differs in cytology in having 2n = 82 chromosomes (164 in D. dilatata). Leaves of D. expansa are very similar to those of D. arguta.

The species name of this fern, expansa, is from the Latin expando, meaning "to spread out, spread apart, to expand". Other common names include northern wood fern, arching wood fern, spiny wood fern and crested wood fern.

Uses
The root contains filicin, a substance that paralyses tapeworms and other internal parasites and has been used in herbal medicine as a worm expellent.

References

External links

 Flora Europaea. Dryopteris expansa
 Flora of North America  Dryopteris expansa
 Plants For A Future: Dryopteris expansa

expansa
Ferns of Asia
Ferns of Europe
Ferns of the Americas
Ferns of the United States
Ferns of California
Flora of Ontario
Flora of Canada
Plants described in 1825